Wickersley is a village and civil parish in the Metropolitan Borough of Rotherham in South Yorkshire, England, situated  from the centre of Rotherham. The area is very near to road junctions for the M1, M18 and A1(M) (passing through Bramley, Rotherham). It is home to the secondary school and sixth form, Wickersley School and Sports College.

Historical background 
Wickersley was once held by Richard FitzTurgis (who adopted the name 'de Wickersley), founder of Roche Abbey, and subsequently by his heirs by marriage, the de Livet (Levett) family. The Wickersleys later removed to Sheffield, where they built the home Broom Hall.  The village of Wickersley has a population of 7,235 increasing to 7,392 at the 2011 Census.

Wickersley School and Sports College is one of the area's largest institutions with a student body of over 2,000 eleven to eighteen-year-olds and a teaching staff of over 300.

There are 3 churches in Wickersley. Wickersley's parish church, which is part  of the Church of England diocese of Sheffield, is dedicated to St Alban and it is one of the oldest buildings in Wickersley. There is also Blessed Trinity Roman Catholic church, as well as a Methodist church.

Sport 

 Cricket - Wickersley Old Village CC based on Northfield Lane

See also
Listed buildings in Wickersley

References

External links

Wickersley Parish Council
Wickersley school and sports college website
History of Wickersley
de Wickersley of Broomhall and Wickersley, wickersley.co.uk
 

Villages in South Yorkshire
Geography of the Metropolitan Borough of Rotherham
Civil parishes in South Yorkshire